Poanes viator, the broad-winged skipper, is a skipper butterfly found in North America.

Distribution
It ranges from Texas to Florida and along the east coast to Massachusetts and west to southern Quebec and Ontario to the Dakotas.

Host plants
Larvae feed on Carex sp. and Phragmites australis.

References

External links
Broad-winged Skipper, Butterflies of Canada
Broad-winged Skipper, Butterflies and Moths of North America

Poanes
Butterflies of North America
Butterflies described in 1865
Taxa named by William Henry Edwards